Lucile Ellerbe Godbold (May 31, 1900 – April 5, 1981) was an American track and field athlete. She competed in the long jump and several running and throwing events at the 1922 Women's World Games, also known as the First International Games for Women, and won a gold medal in the shot put and a bronze in the javelin throw; she finished fourth in the 300 m and 1000 m races.

In 1922 Godbold graduated in physical education from the Winthrop College and in September of that year she began a 58-year teaching career at Columbia College in Columbia, South Carolina. During her time at the college, 'Miss Ludy' as she was affectionately known, became a local legend; in time, an annual touch football game was begun by the students in her honor and was named the 'Ludy Bowl.' Although the exact date is uncertain, it is believed the first Ludy Bowl took place on the campus of the college somewhere between 1952 and 1955 and is still played today during the college's Homecoming Weekend. In 1961, Godbold became the first woman to be inducted into the South Carolina Sports Hall of Fame. In 1971 Columbia College's new physical education center was named in her honor.

References

1981 deaths
Columbia College (South Carolina) faculty
1900 births
American female shot putters
American female javelin throwers
Women's World Games medalists
20th-century American women
20th-century American people
American women academics